William Mansel Howells (born 20 March 1943) was an English professional footballer who played as a defender. He played in the Football League for Grimsby Town before moving into non-league football with Boston United, where he set a record for most first-team appearances for the club with 572, of which 383 were in league matches.

References

1943 births
Living people
Footballers from Grimsby
English footballers
Association football defenders
Grimsby Town F.C. players
Boston United F.C. players
English Football League players